is a national highway located entirely within Wakayama Prefecture, Japan. It connects the cities of Tanabe and Kinokawa, spanning the western side of the prefecture in a south–north routing.

Route description

National Route 424 is a national highway that does not leave Wakayama Prefecture. The highway connects the cities of Tanabe and Kinokawa, running south–north across the prefecture. The highway almost entirely runs through the prefecture's inland mountainous area, paralleling the coastal routing of National Route 42 and the Hanwa Expressway; however, the southernmost section of the highway between Minabe and Tanabe runs along the prefecture's west coast.

History
On 1 April 1982, National Route 424 was established by the Cabinet of Japan between the city of Tanabe and the former town of Uchita which has since been merged into the city of Kinokawa. In 1996 a project began to widen and straighten a winding one-lane section of the road along the Shuri River in Aridagawa. The realignment project was completed on 11 July 2012 with a total cost of 8.9 billion yen. Another project began in 2010 in Minabe to straighten and shorten the highway. The project was significantly delayed by landslides caused by Tropical Storm Talas on 5 September 2011. On 2 October 2017, the project was completed, shortening the total length of the highway by about a kilometer and a half.

Major intersections
The route lies entirely within Wakayama Prefecture.

See also

References

External links

National highways in Japan
Roads in Wakayama Prefecture